The Continental Mark VI is a full-size luxury car that was produced by Ford Motor Company from 1980 to 1983.  The fifth generation of the Mark series, the Continental Mark VI introduced several changes to the model line.  Again marketed and serviced by the Lincoln-Mercury division, the Mark VI served as the flagship of the entire Ford Motor Company model line, slotted above the Lincoln Town Car.

The first complete redesign of the Mark series since 1972, the Mark VI was the first generation of the model line to undergo downsizing.  In another significant change, the Mark VI shifted mechanical commonality from the 1967–1976 Ford Thunderbird (its companion model since the inaugural 1969 Mark III) to the Lincoln Continental (renamed Lincoln Town Car for 1981).  To distinguish itself from the Town Car, the Mark VI was fitted with model-exclusive features (including the return of Designer Edition trims).  Alongside the traditional two-door sedan bodystyle, the Mark VI introduced a four-door sedan to the model line (last offered in 1960).

The Continental Mark VI was produced alongside the Lincoln Continental and Town Car at the Ford Wixom Assembly Plant in Wixom, Michigan.  In total, 131,981 examples were produced.  For the 1984 model year, the Mark VI was replaced by the Continental Mark VII.

Development 
During the mid-1970s, within Ford Motor Company, development of a downsized Continental Mark VI (as a successor to the Continental Mark V) began life on what became the Ford Fox platform, intending to downsize it alongside the Ford Thunderbird and Mercury Cougar XR7 for 1980.  However, due to budgetary constraints, Ford product planners chose a different design direction for the Mark VI, as the project switched from the compact/mid-size Fox chassis to the (downsized) full-size Panther platform, to allow increased parts commonality with the Lincoln Continental.

Based on the success of the Mark IV and Mark V, Ford executives (led by Lee Iaccoca) sought to expand the Mark series from a single personal luxury coupe into a comprehensive model line, reviving a stillborn approach proposed 20 years earlier with the Continental Division.  As part of the switch to the full-size Panther platform, executives sought to add a four-door sedan, a woodgrained station wagon, and a premium 2-seat coupe to the Mark VI model line.

Following the 1978 departure of Lee Iaccoca from Ford, the expansion of the Mark V model line was pared down to a four-door sedan.  While the shift to the Panther chassis meant only an intermediate degree of downsizing (leaving the Mark VI far larger than the redesigned Cadillac Eldorado and Chrysler Cordoba), the Mark VI remained an intermediate step down from its Mark V predecessor.  Along with its high degree of parts commonality with the Lincoln line (and mass-market vehicles such as the Ford LTD), allowing for the model line to be profitable, the Mark VI was to combine both luxury features and advanced technology.

Overview

Chassis 

The Continental Mark VI is based on the Ford Panther platform, shared with the Lincoln Town Car and other Ford Motor Company full-size cars of the 1980s into the late 2000s in North America.  The Mark VI is rear-wheel drive with body-on-frame construction; it is fitted with coil-spring suspension on all four wheels.

In comparison to the Continental Mark V, the Mark VI is 800 pounds lighter and nearly 14 inches shorter than its predecessor.  The Mark VI is the only version of the Panther platform that is built on two different wheelbases.  The four-door sedan shares the 117.4 wheelbase with the Lincoln Continental/Town Car; the two-door utilizes the 114.4 wheelbase shared by the Ford and Mercury variants.

Powertrain 
In order to remain in compliance with increasingly stringent federal fuel economy standards (under CAFE, Ford Motor Company was required to average 20.0 MPG for all of its vehicles for 1980), significant changes were made to the powertrain for the Continental Mark VI.  The 460 and 400 cubic-inch V8s seen in the Mark V were replaced in favor of lower-displacement V8 engines.

The standard engine for the Mark VI was a 302 cubic-inch V8, producing 140 hp.  The first Ford V8 produced with fuel injection, the engine was marketed by its 5.0L metric displacement (slightly rounded up from the technical 4.94L figure).  As an option, a 351 cubic-inch (5.8L) V8 was offered; it used an electronically-controlled 2-barrel carburetor.  After 1980, the 351 was discontinued on the Mark VI, due to poor sales and the lack of a distinct power advantage over the 5.0L V8.

Both engines were paired to the AOD automatic transmission; introduced for 1980, the AOD replaced the commonly used 3-speed configuration with a 4-speed overdrive configuration, significantly lowering engine RPMs (and fuel consumption) at highway speeds.  The 4-speed AOD was standard equipment on the Mark VI and all Lincolns (except the Versailles) for 1980 and was adopted by Panther-chassis Ford and Mercury vehicles for 1981.

Body 

As the Mark V remained throughout its production, much of its sharp-edged design played a role in the design of the downsized Panther-platform Lincolns.  While the hardtop roofline of the two-door was replaced by a fixed B-pillar (with framed door glass), the Mark VI two-door shared a similar roofline with its predecessor; the four-door shared its roofline with the Lincoln Town Car (distinguished by oval opera windows).

In line with its flagship model status, the Mark VI had more ornate styling than the Lincoln Town Car, including hidden headlamps, fender vents (non-functional), C-pillar oval opera windows, and forward-sloping taillamps; the Continental tire trunklid returned nearly unchanged from the Mark V.

The Mark VI also was one of the first cars seen with several features commonly seen today; it came with the all-new Keyless Entry System, digital instrumentation (VFD), and trip computer.  Also, it was the first year for the EEC III engine management system which kept fuel economy high and emissions low, an industry first.

As an unusual option, the Mark VI offered "touring lights", which mounted low-power lights on the hidden-headlamp doors.  The touring lights were turned on when the headlight switch was in the parking light position. While giving a soft glow, they did not provide sufficient light to drive in dark conditions and did not function as daytime running lights.  This generation was also installed with Ford's "Auto Lamp" feature, and if the system was active, the touring lights would not be used when the conventional headlights came on (stowing the touring lights). Each Mark VI was also equipped with parking lights integrated with the front turn signals, so the addition of the optional touring lights was a styling flourish.

Trim 
Alongside the standard Continental Mark VI, two additional trims were offered within the model line, including the Designer Editions and the flagship Signature Series.

Signature Series 
For 1980, the Signature Series was available in both coupe and sedan formats.  Intended as a successor to the 1979 Collector's Series option package, the Signature Series included nearly every available feature as standard equipment.  The option was offered with either burgundy or silver exteriors; all vehicles came with a red interior (leather or velour upholstery).  When first introduced in September 1979, final cost could exceed $24,000 USD.

Unique features included a rechargeable glove box flashlight, special seat sew pattern, gold and Macaser Ebony wood treatments and a complete digital instrument cluster with fully electronically controlled EEC III engine with a 4-speed AOD, and a leather-bound tool kit in the trunk.

The Signature Series returned for 1981; red and silver exteriors were again offered, with black and white exterior colors becoming an option near the end of the model year.  As with 1980, all examples were produced with red interiors, in leather or velour. For 1982 and 1983, the Mark VI Signature Series underwent a revision, as it became available in any exterior and interior color offered for the Mark VI.  The tool kit and glove box flashlight were no longer featured as well.

Designer Series

For 1980, the Designer Series made their return to the Mark Series coupes, including  Cartier, Pucci, Bill Blass, and Givenchy Editions.  As before, each Designer Series option carried exclusive exterior and interior color combination and additional equipment over the standard-trim Mark VI; these trim packages remained unchanged through 1982.

For 1982, the series underwent a shuffle of sorts, with the Pucci edition moving from the sedan from the coupe.  The Cartier edition was shifted from the Mark VI to the Town Car, leaving the Bill Blass and Givenchy edition coupes.

For 1983, the Givenchy Edition was shifted to the Continental, leaving the Bill Blass coupe and Pucci sedan; a coupe version of the Pucci edition made its return as a mid-year introduction.

Sales

See also
Lincoln Town Car
Ford Panther platform

References

External links

Mark 6
Ford Panther platform
Cars introduced in 1980
Luxury vehicles
Full-size vehicles
Rear-wheel-drive vehicles
Personal luxury cars
Cars discontinued in 1983